The Grand lac Caotibi is a lake in Quebec, Canada.

Location

It is in the Duplessis tourist region of Côte-Nord.
The lake is in the unorganized territory of Lac-Walker, Sept-Rivières Regional County Municipality, Quebec.
As of November 2021 the Commission de toponymie of Quebec had not determined the origin or meaning of the name.

Hydrology

The Grand lac Caotibi is elongated, in a north-south direction, with a western portion connected to the main lake by a channel.
Lac Arthur empties into Grand lac Caotibi, which in turn drains north through Petit lac Caotibi into the Northeast Toulnustouc River.

Land use

The Cartier Railway runs along the east of the lake, between it and Lac Arthur further to the east.
The line runs from Port-Cartier on the Gulf of St. Lawrence north past Petit lac Manicouagan to the Mont Wright mine, southwest of Labrador City.
On 22 August 1957 the Quebec government reserved an area of land  on each side of the railway and on each side of Grand Lac Caotibi and Petit Lac Caotibi, and including the lakes, on which mining claims could no longer be staked.

During public consultations on land use in the area held in 2016-2019, concerns were raised about maintaining the quality and productivity of the aquatic ecosystems of several strategic lakes in the wildlife reserve.
These were Grand lac Coatibi, Lake Arthur and Lac du Nord-Est.
Access to the south of Petit lac Caotibi for conservation purposes was requested.
No watercourse crossings should be allowed within the first  of the tributaries of Grand lac Caotibi or Lac Bourgeois.

Notes

Sources

Lakes of Côte-Nord